Forcett Hall is an English country house in the village of Forcett, North Yorkshire, England, some  west of Darlington. It is a Grade I listed building.

History
Forcett had been in the possession of the Shuttleworth family of Gawthorpe Hall, Lancashire since 1582. Forcett Hall was originally an Elizabethan house, modified in 1710 by William Benson. After a fire in 1726 it was substantially redesigned in 1740 in the Palladian style by architect Daniel Garrett under Richard Shuttleworth, MP, vacating the family seat at Gawthorpe to move in.

It passed to his son James, MP for Preston and Lancashire and High Sheriff of Yorkshire for 1760–61. James' son Robert inherited the property on his father's death in 1773 but sold it in 1784. His son Robert moved back to live at Gawthorpe.

Robert, let Forcett Hall to Algernon Percy, 1st Earl of Beverley, who remained in occupation when Robert Shuttleworth sold the Forcett Hall Estate in 1785 to Frances Michell and her son, Charles Michell. Forcett Hall passed by descent until 1938 when it was bought by Lieutenant Colonel Hardress Waller.

It acted as family home to the Heathcote family from 1938 to 2020, managed by James and Alison Heathcote, who provided hospitality for special and corporate events.

In 2011, the property was placed on the market with an asking price of £5.5 million. The house featured in 2016 in the Channel 4 series Obsessive Compulsive Cleaners. The price was lowered to £4 million, and according to the listing, is in need of some refurbishment.

In 2021 the hall was acquired by property developer Karen Stephenson.

Architecture 
The  building has three floors, and a basement with four main reception rooms, 15 bedrooms and a self-contained east wing with three further bedrooms. It is approached through an arched carriageway with four Roman Doric columns and a Doric frieze. Nearby are Grade II listed north and south lodges.

Park 
It stands in 85 hectares of parkland which contains several listed buildings including a grotto incorporating an ice house and mount, a wilderness garden, the Stanwick Late Iron Age Oppidum, and a large collection of veteran and rare trees, including one of the largest cedar trees in the country. The park is on the English Heritage Register of Historic Parks and Gardens of Special Historic Interest. The dovecote is a Grade II listed building of 1740, designed by Garnett.

References

Country houses in North Yorkshire
Grade I listed buildings in North Yorkshire
Grade I listed houses
Houses completed in 1710
1710 establishments in England